St. Francis Xavier Catholic High School or St. FX is a high school in Ottawa, Ontario, Canada, in the Ottawa Catholic School Board. The school serves grades 7-12 and opened in 2009. It is located in Gloucester and mainly serves the communities of Riverside South and Gloucester.

History
St. Francis Xavier opened in 2009, the first high school built in an area with a growing population; it drew students from local public high schools as well as from St. Patrick's High School, St. Mark Catholic High School, and St. Pius X High School.

The first class graduated in June 2011; valedictorian was Joseph McGuire.

Athletics
The school's teams are the Coyotes. It joined the National Capital Secondary School Athletic Association for its first season, 2009–10, when it planned to compete in basketball and soccer (senior and junior boys and girls), volleyball (senior girls and junior boys), football (junior boys), golf, hockey (boys and girls), cross-country running, track and field, curling, wrestling, cross-country and Alpine skiing, snowboarding, badminton, and field lacrosse.

Notable people

Daniel McInnis, class of 2015, patented a hockey helmet and a 3D scanner for bone transplants and prosthetics fabrication and won science fair awards and a scholarship to the University of Toronto.

See also 

 List of Ottawa, Ontario schools

References

High schools in Ottawa
Catholic secondary schools in Ontario
Educational institutions established in 2009
2009 establishments in Ontario
Middle schools in Ottawa